Dariusz Adamczuk (born 21 October 1969) is a Polish former footballer.

Career

Club
He started his career with Pogoń Szczecin during the 1987–88 season, before moving on to play for Eintracht Frankfurt, Dundee, Udinese Calcio and Belenenses.

It was in the 1999–00 season that he would get his big break, signing on a free transfer for Scottish champions Rangers from Dundee. He started off as a regular in the Rangers team, making 16 appearances up to and including a UEFA Cup tie against Borussia Dortmund on 7 December 1999, but didn't make any further appearances that season. The following season he made 3 appearances in the league across October and November 2000, however these would be his last appearances for Rangers. He had a loan spell at English club Wigan Athletic in 2001. In 2002 it was reported that he was suffering from depression. Adamczuk retired in 2002, then returned in 2006 to play for Pogoń Szczecin Nowa.

National team
He was a member of the Poland team that won the silver medal at the 1992 Summer Olympics in Barcelona.

In eleven matches for Poland, his solitary goal was against England in 1993 during a World Cup qualifier at the Stadion Slaski in Chorzów.

References

External links 
 
 
 
 
 
 

1969 births
Living people
Polish footballers
Polish expatriate footballers
Polish expatriate sportspeople in Italy
Scottish Premier League players
Scottish Football League players
Olympic footballers of Poland
Olympic silver medalists for Poland
Footballers at the 1992 Summer Olympics
Pogoń Szczecin players
Dundee F.C. players
Udinese Calcio players
C.F. Os Belenenses players
Bundesliga players
Eintracht Frankfurt players
Poland international footballers
Rangers F.C. players
Wigan Athletic F.C. players
Serie A players
Expatriate footballers in Italy
Expatriate footballers in Germany
Expatriate footballers in Scotland
Expatriate footballers in England
Expatriate footballers in Portugal
Polish expatriate sportspeople in Portugal
Sportspeople from Szczecin
Ekstraklasa players
Olympic medalists in football
English Football League players
Medalists at the 1992 Summer Olympics
Association football midfielders